Zygonyx regisalberti is a species of dragonfly in the family Libellulidae. It is found in Angola, Cameroon, the Republic of the Congo, the Democratic Republic of the Congo, Ghana, Guinea, Liberia, Nigeria, Sierra Leone, Tanzania, Togo, and Uganda. Its natural habitats are subtropical or tropical moist lowland forests and rivers.

References

Libellulidae
Taxonomy articles created by Polbot
Insects described in 1934